Obi is a surname and a given name. "Obi" means "Heart" in the Igbo language of Southeastern Nigeria. People bearing the name include:

Surname:
Anthony Obi, Nigerian army officer and politician
Chike Obi (1921–2008), Nigerian politician and mathematician
Jide Obi (born 1962), Nigerian musician
Joel Obi (born 1991), footballer
Paul Obi, Nigerian military officer and politician
Peter Obi (born 1961), Nigerian politician

Given name:
 Obi Ikechukwu Charles (born 1985), Nigerian footballer
 Obi Egbuna (1938–2014), Nigerian-born novelist, playwright and political activist in the UK
 Obi Ezeh (born 1988), American football player
 Obi Melifonwu (born 1994), American football player
 Obi Emmanuel Moneke (born 1983), Nigerian footballer

Nickname:
 Obi Toppin (born 1998; first name Obadiah), American basketball player